Cold House is the fifth studio album by English post-rock band Hood. It was released on Domino Recording Company on 12 November 2001. Three tracks feature vocal contributions from Doseone and Why?, two-thirds of the hip hop group Clouddead. "You Show No Emotion at All" was released as a single from the album.

Critical reception

At Metacritic, which assigns a weighted average score out of 100 to reviews from mainstream critics, Cold House received an average score of 87, based on 14 reviews, indicating "universal acclaim".

Bradley Torreano of AllMusic described the album as "the next step toward the icy-cold future of alternative rock that Kid A forecasted". Philip Sherburne of Cleveland Scene called it "not only one of the most melancholy records of late, but also a triumph of musical gene splicing, drawing together folk-flavored indie rock and the skittering beats of experimental electronica". Nathan Rooney of Pitchfork commented that "with Cold House, Hood seem to have finally stumbled into a sound all their own".

In 2016, Fact ranked Cold House at number 14 on its list of the best post-rock albums of all time, while Paste ranked it as the 44th best post-rock album.

Track listing

Personnel
Credits adapted from liner notes.

 Hood – music, post production, recording, mixing
 Doseone – additional vocals (1, 3, 10), additional lyrics (1, 3, 10)
 Why? – additional vocals (1, 3, 10), additional lyrics (1, 3, 10)
 Matthew Robson – additional drums (6)
 Sarah McWatt – flute
 Andrew Staveley – trumpet
 Richard Formby – acoustic guitar, recording
 Choque Hosein – post production, mixing
 C. Adams – photography
 S. Royle – photography
 M. Cooper – sleeve design

References

External links
 
 

2001 albums
Hood (band) albums
Domino Recording Company albums